WBCN may refer to:
 WBCN (AM), an AM radio station in North Fort Myers, Florida, United States
 WWBX, an FM radio station in Boston, Massachusetts, which held the WBCN call sign from 1968 to 2009
 WBCN (North Carolina), an AM radio station in Charlotte, North Carolina, which held the call sign from 2009 to 2021